The Impressions' Greatest Hits is the first compilation album by R&B vocal group The Impressions.

Track listing
All tracks written by Curtis Mayfield unless noted.

Side A
 "Gypsy Woman"
 "Talking About My Baby"
 "I'm So Proud"
 "Keep On Pushing"
 "Never Let Me Go" (Joseph Scott)
 "It's All Right"

Side B
 "You Must Believe Me"
 "Sad, Sad Girl and Boy"
 "I'm the One Who Loves You"
 "Minstrel and Queen"
 "Grow Closer Together"
 "Amen" (Mayfield, Johnny Pate)

External links
The Impressions' Greatest Hits at Discogs

The Impressions albums
1965 greatest hits albums
ABC Records compilation albums